William Foulis (fl. 1420s – 1440s) was a 15th-century Scottish political figure. He was archdeacon of St. Andrews, provost of Bothwell, and Keeper of the Privy Seal of Scotland in the late 1420s and into the 1430s, under James I of Scotland. He was also briefly the Secretary of State of Scotland, in 1429.

By a daughter of Sir William Ogilvie, Foulis had two sons, of whom James, the younger, became a merchant in Edinburgh. James, in turn, was the father of the eminent judge, James Foulis.

References

Date of birth unknown
Date of death unknown
Members of the Privy Council of Scotland
15th-century Scottish people